The Nottinghamshire and Derbyshire trolleybus system once linked the city of Nottingham, in the county of Nottinghamshire, England, with Ripley, in the neighbouring county of Derbyshire.

By the standards of the various now-defunct trolleybus systems in the United Kingdom, the system was a small and short-lived one, with a total of three routes, and a maximum fleet of 32 trolleybuses.

Three of the former Notts & Derby system trolleybuses are now preserved, one of them at the Trolleybus Museum at Sandtoft (although not currently on display), and the other two in a private collection in Boughton, Nottinghamshire.

The city of Nottingham was also served by the Nottingham trolleybus system, in operation between 1927 and 1966. A Derby trolley bus network also existed from 1932 to 1967, having also taken over from tramcars. It finished when extensive roadworks made alterations to the overhead wiring uneconomic.

See also

History of Nottingham
Transport in Nottingham
List of trolleybus systems in the United Kingdom

References

Notes

Further reading

External links

National Trolleybus Archive
British Trolleybus Society, based in Reading
National Trolleybus Association, based in London

Transport in Nottinghamshire
Transport in Derbyshire
Nottinghamshire And Derbyshire
Nottinghamshire And Derbyshire